FC Tytan Donetsk was a professional football team based in Donetsk, Ukraine. Tytan Donetsk entered the professional competition in 2007. Titan Donetsk currently compete in the Druha Liha B.
After the 2008–2009 season the club withdrew from the PFL.

League and cup history

{|class="wikitable"
|-bgcolor="#efefef"
! Season
! Div.
! Pos.
! Pl.
! W
! D
! L
! GS
! GA
! P
!Domestic Cup
!colspan=2|Europe
!Notes
|-
|align=center|2007–08
|align=center|3rd "B"
|align=center|11
|align=center|34
|align=center|11
|align=center|7
|align=center|16
|align=center|44
|align=center|52
|align=center|40
|align=center|Did not enter
|align=center|
|align=center|
|align=center|
|-
|align=center|2008–09
|align=center|3rd "B"
|align=center|9
|align=center|34
|align=center|12
|align=center|11
|align=center|11
|align=center|37
|align=center|33
|align=center|47
|align=center|1/64 finals
|align=center|
|align=center|
|align=center|Withdrew
|}

Managers
 2006–2009 Yevhen Korol
 2009–2009 Serhiy Pohodin

References

External links
   Official team website 

 
Tytan Donetsk
Tytan
Tytan Donetsk
Tytan Donetsk
Tytan Donetsk
Tytan Donetsk